Chenchun Road is a station on Line 13 of the Shanghai Metro, part of phase two of the line.  Located at Hunan Road and Chenchun Road in Pudong, Shanghai, the station opened with the rest of phases 2 and 3 of Line 13 on 30 December 2018.

References 

Railway stations in Shanghai
Shanghai Metro stations in Pudong
Railway stations in China opened in 2018
Line 13, Shanghai Metro